Chen-Hao Lin (born 26 October 1997) is a Taiwanese judoka. She competed in the women's 48 kg event at the 2020 Summer Olympics held in Tokyo, Japan.

She is the bronze medallist of the 2021 Asian-Pacific Judo Championships in the -48 kg category.

References

External links

 
 

1997 births
Living people
Taiwanese female judoka
Judoka at the 2020 Summer Olympics
Olympic judoka of Taiwan
21st-century Taiwanese women